Maxim Grigorievich Vlasov (13 August 1767 - 21 June 1848) was a Russian commander, general of the cavalry (1843), and chieftain of the Don Cossack army (1836). He commanded the Russian troops during the Russo-Circassian War and played a major role in the Circassian genocide.

References 

Deaths from cholera
People of the Caucasian War
Russian commanders of the Napoleonic Wars
Knights First Class of the Order of the Sword
Recipients of the Pour le Mérite (military class)
Recipients of the Gold Sword for Bravery
Recipients of the Order of St. Vladimir, 4th class
Recipients of the Order of St. Vladimir, 3rd class
Recipients of the Order of St. Vladimir, 2nd class
Recipients of the Order of St. Vladimir, 1st class
Recipients of the Order of St. George of the Fourth Degree
Recipients of the Order of St. George of the Third Degree
1848 deaths
1767 births
Russian military personnel of the Caucasian War
Circassian genocide perpetrators